Okopy is a selo in western Ukraine. It is located in Chortkiv Raion (district) of Ternopil Oblast (province), and had its origins as a Polish fortress at the meeting of the Zbruch and Dniester rivers. It belongs to Melnytsia-Podilska settlement hromada, one of the hromadas of Ukraine. 

The current estimated population is around 557 (as of 2005).

Name
The settlement was previously referred to as Okopy Svyatoyi Triytsi (Ukrainian: Окопи Святої Трійці; ; Russian: Окопы Святой Троицы), translated as the Ramparts of the Holy Trinity.

History
The stronghold and the neighbouring town were built in 1692, by Stanisław Jan Jabłonowski, Grand Hetman of the Crown. The site was chosen by King Jan III Sobieski of Poland, as a measure to stop a possible attack from the nearby Turkish-seized fortresses of Kamieniec Podolski, twenty kilometers away, and Chocim, eight kilometers away. The fortress was expanded by Tylman of Gameren, one of the most notable Polish architects of the time.

The site is a natural fortress: a small strip of high rocks linking the Zbruch and Dnister rivers. Tylman of Gameren decided to build a double line of fortifications (two rampart lines of bastion system) with two gates leading east- (Kamieniec Gate) and westwards (Lwów Gate). Other directions were defended by towered walls and natural escarpments over the river banks, with walls stretching along both sides of isthmus on the edge of steep slope to the river. The construction was started under the command of the General of Horse Artillery, Marcin Katski, and the works were finished in the same year. The nearby village was also fortified. In 1693 Jan III Sobieski built a votive church in the compound. Israel ben Eliezer, a Jewish mystical rabbi and the founder of the Hasidic Jewish movement, was born in Okopy in 1698 (although he later lived in nearby Tluste).

The stronghold was abandoned in 1699, when the rest of Podolia was returned  to Poland, and the fortress lost its importance as a counterbalance to Kamieniec Podolski. In 1769, the Bar Confederacy, defended the stronghold against the besieging forces of Russia. The defence was commanded by the future Hero of the American Revolutionary War, Kazimierz Pułaski.

After the Partitions of Poland in 1772, the village and the ruins of the stronghold  became the easternmost point of Austrian Galicia. The nearby town was abandoned, and the inhabitants of the village moved inside the fortress walls. Most of the houses that were built were made from the stones that had been used to construct the earlier defensive walls. The remaining parts of the stronghold (both gates, one of the forts, the ruins of the Holy Trinity church and parts of the walls) were partially restored in 1905 by count Mieczysław Dunin-Borkowski.

After the Polish-Bolshevik War of 1920, the site was made part of Poland, in the Tarnopol Voivodship, near the Polish border with the Soviet Union and Romania. The 14th battalion of the Border Defence Corps were stationed there. In the interbellum, the village was known for its wineries and peach orchards. It became a holidays center for the inhabitants of the nearby cities of Ternopil, and Lviv.

After the World War II, the site was annexed by the Soviet Union. The village was renamed "Okopy" and was turned into a Kolkhoz, and soon totally depopulated, as a result of the forced migration of Poles to Siberia.

The ruins of the stronghold can be found in the western part of the village.

The name of the fortress was popularized in Poland by Zygmunt Krasiński's usage of it in his drama Nie-Boska komedia (The Un-divine Comedy,1835).

Until 18 July 2020, Okopy belonged to Borshchiv Raion. The raion was abolished in July 2020 as part of the administrative reform of Ukraine, which reduced the number of raions of Ternopil Oblast to three. The area of Borshchiv Raion was merged into Chortkiv Raion.

Notable people
 Baal Shem Tov, founder of the 18th century Hasidic movement; also an ancestor of the rabbi of Kyiv Nukhym Vaisblat and Volodymyr Vaisblat

References

External links
 Okopy Świętej Trójcy in the Geographical Dictionary of the Kingdom of Poland (1886) 
 Original plan of the stronghold
 Photo of Castle Trenches of the Holy Trinity on Castles.com.ua
 Temples of Podolia. Borschiv Region
 Okopy at Architectural Landmarks of Ukraine

Villages in Chortkiv Raion
Forts in Ukraine
1690s establishments in the Polish–Lithuanian Commonwealth
Populated places established in 1692
1692 establishments in Europe